Crocus aleppicus is a species of flowering plant in the genus Crocus of the family Iridaceae, that is found from West Syria to Israel to Jordan.

References

aleppicus
Plants described in 1873